Thirumala-Devi Kanneganti is an immunologist and is the Rose Marie Thomas Endowed Chair, Vice Chair of the Department of Immunology, and Member at St. Jude Children's Research Hospital. Her research interests include innate immunity and inflammatory cell death with a primary focus on the role of NLR proteins, inflammasomes, and PANoptosis in health and disease.

Early life and education 
Kanneganti is from Kothagudem, Telangana (United Andhra Pradesh), India. She received her undergraduate degree from Singareni Collieries Women's College, Kothagudem at Kakatiya University, where she majored in chemistry, zoology, and botany. She then received her M.Sc. and PhD from Osmania University in India.

Career 
Kanneganti began her career in research as a PhD student studying plant pathogens and fungal toxins. She then went on to do postdoctoral fellowships at the University of Wisconsin and the Ohio State University studying fungal genetics and plant innate immunity. She transitioned to study mammalian innate immunity at the University of Michigan. She joined St. Jude Children's Research Hospital as an Assistant Member in the Immunology Department in 2007, where she has focused on studying inflammasomes and cell death. She was promoted to a full Member in 2013. She became Vice Chair of the Immunology Department in 2016 and was endowed with the Rose Marie Thomas Endowed Chair in 2017.

Major contributions

Discovery of NLRP3 inflammasome, ZBP1- and AIM2-PANoptosomes, and PANoptosis as therapeutic targets for infectious and inflammatory diseases and cancer 
Kanneganti is well known for her breakthrough discoveries elucidating functions of innate immune receptors, inflammasomes, and inflammatory cell death and for making fundamental contributions to inflammasome biology and the cell death field. Her studies along with those from other groups published in 2006 provided the first genetic evidence for the role of NLRP3 in the formation of the inflammasome, caspase-1 activation, and IL-1β/IL-18 maturation. These initial studies showed that microbial components, ATP, and MSU crystals activate the NLRP3 inflammasome.

Kanneganti discovered that Influenza A virus, Candida, and Aspergillus specifically activate the NLRP3 inflammasome and elucidated the physiological role of the NLRP3 inflammasome in host defense. Beyond infectious diseases, her lab also established the importance of the NLRP3 inflammasome in autoinflammatory diseases, intestinal inflammation, neuroinflammation, cancer, and metabolic diseases.

Kanneganti's lab has also worked on the upstream regulatory mechanisms of NLRP3 and inflammasome-induced inflammatory cell death, pyroptosis. Her lab identified caspase-8 and FADD as expression and activation regulators of both the canonical and non-canonical NLRP3 inflammasome/pyroptosis. Her group also characterized redundancies between caspase-1 and caspase-8 and between NLRP3 and caspase-8 in autoinflammatory disease and linked diet and the microbiome to these processes. These studies demonstrated that the NLRP3 inflammasome/pyroptotic pathway is closely connected to the caspase-8–mediated programmed cell death pathway. This finding went against the dogma that existed at that time that caspase-8 and FADD were involved only in apoptosis.

Following up on her original discovery that NLRP3 senses viral RNAs, her lab has discovered Z-DNA binding protein 1 (ZBP1)/DAI as an innate immune sensor of influenza virus upstream of the NLRP3 inflammasome/pyroptosis; she also showed ZBP1 to be a key regulator of apoptosis and necroptosis, establishing it as an upstream cell death sensor. This study also highlighted the redundancy between pyroptotic, apoptotic, and necroptotic cell death execution.

Her lab also established that transforming growth factor beta-activated kinase 1 (TAK1) can act as a master regulator that maintains cellular homeostasis by negatively regulating the NLRP3 inflammasome and inflammatory cell death.  Collectively, these studies identified caspase-8, ZBP1, and TAK1 as master molecular switches of inflammasome activation/pyroptosis, apoptosis, and necroptosis and pioneered the establishment of the fundamental concept of PANoptosis. PANoptosis is a unique innate immune inflammatory cell death pathway regulated by multifaceted PANoptosome complexes that have been visualized in single cells to integrate components from other cell death pathways. The biological effects of PANoptosis cannot be individually accounted for by pyroptosis, apoptosis, or necroptosis alone. 

PANoptosis is implicated in driving innate immune responses and inflammation. Kanneganti's research group has also further elucidated the molecular mechanisms of PANoptosis and showed that the enigmatic caspase-6 is critical for ZBP1-mediated NLRP3 inflammasome activation, PANoptosis, innate immune responses, and host defense against influenza virus. Her lab also showed that coronavirus activates PANoptosis and that inhibiting the NLRP3 inflammasome or gasdermin D during coronavirus infection actually increases cell death and cytokine secretion rather than decreasing them. Kanneganti's research has now also established that multiple PANoptosomes can contain different sensors and respond to different triggers, with the ZBP1-PANoptosome responding to influenza virus infection, and the newly discovered AIM2-PANoptosome responding to Francisella and herpes simplex virus 1 infections. Irrespective of the sensors, formation of the PANoptosome mediates inflammatory cell death.

Her group went on to discover the role of PANoptosis in cytokine storm, identifying TNF and IFN-γ as key cytokines that cause this inflammatory cell death pathway and lead to lung damage, organ failure, and lethality. Kanneganti's research group also showed that inhibiting TNF and IFN-γ could prevent lethality in SARS-CoV-2 infection, septic shock, hemophagocytic lymphohistiocytosis, and cytokine shock in mice. This led her to advocate for the evaluation of a strategy to repurpose approved drugs that inhibit TNF-α or IFN-γ, as well as those that target other molecules in the PANoptosis pathway (e.g., JAK), to prevent the cytokine storm and pathogenesis. Additional work in Kanneganti's lab focusing on beta-coronaviruses showed that IFN induces ZBP1-mediated PANoptosis, which causes morbidity and mortality. These findings led her team to suggest that inhibiting ZBP1 may improve the efficacy of IFN therapy for COVID-19 and impact other infectious and inflammatory diseases where IFNs cause pathology.

Beyond infectious disease and inflammatory syndromes, Kanneganti's group has also found that activating PANoptosis could be beneficial to eliminate cancer cells. Treatment of cancer cells with PANoptosis-inducing agents TNF and IFN-γ can reduce tumor size in preclinical models. Her group also discovered a regulatory relationship between ADAR1 and ZBP1 that can be targeted with the combination of nuclear export inhibitors, such as selinexor, and IFN to drive ZBP1-mediated PANoptosis and regress tumors in preclinical models.

Overall, work from Kanneganti's lab has implicated PANoptosis in infectious, metabolic, neurologic, and autoinflammatory diseases and cancer.

Cytokine signaling and disease 
Kanneganti's lab showed compensatory roles for NLRP3/caspase-1 and caspase-8 in the regulation of IL-1β production in osteomyelitis. Additionally, discoveries from her research group suggest that IL-1α and IL-1β can have distinct roles in driving inflammatory disease. She identified the role of the IL-1α and RIPK1/TAK1/SYK signaling pathway in skin inflammation. Furthermore, her studies also showed the role of another IL-1 family member, IL-33, in regulating immune responses and microbiota in the gut. Overall, Kanneganti's lab discovered distinct and previously unrecognized functions of cytokines IL-1α, IL-1β, and IL-33 and their signaling pathways in inflammatory diseases and cancer.

Beyond her studies on IL-1 family members, her recent work on cytokine storm established TNF and IFN-γ as the key upstream cytokines that cause inflammatory cell death (PANoptosis), tissue and organ damage, and mortality and suggest that strategies to target these cytokines or other molecules in their signaling pathway should be evaluated as therapeutic strategies in COVID-19, sepsis, and other diseases associated with cytokine storm.

Honors 

 American Association of Immunology-BD Biosciences Investigator Award (2015)
 Vince Kidd Memorial Mentor of the Year Award (2015)
 Society for Leukocyte Biology Outstanding macrophage researcher Dolph O. Adams Award (2017)
 American Society for Microbiology Eli Lilly and Company-Elanco Research Award (2017)
 Interferon and Cytokine Research Seymour & Vivian Milstein Award for Excellence (2018)
 Clarivates/Web of Science list of Highly Cited Researchers (2017, 2018, 2019, 2020, 2021)
 NIH R35 Outstanding Investigator Award (2020)
Election to Fellowship in the American Academy of Microbiology, American Society for Microbiology (2021)

References 

1972 births
Living people
Women immunologists
Kakatiya University alumni
Scientists from Telangana
St. Jude Children's Research Hospital
Osmania University alumni
American immunologists
American academics of Indian descent
Fellows of the American Academy of Microbiology